Anca Groza (born 23 January 1956) is a Romanian former butterfly swimmer. She competed in the women's 200 metre butterfly at the 1972 Summer Olympics.

References

External links
 

1956 births
Living people
Romanian female butterfly swimmers
Olympic swimmers of Romania
Swimmers at the 1972 Summer Olympics
Sportspeople from Bucharest